Paralacydes destrictus is a moth of the family Erebidae. It was described by Lars Kühne in 2010. It is found in Botswana, Namibia and Zimbabwe.

References

Spilosomina
Moths described in 2010